Mount Pleasant Historic District is a national historic district located at Mount Pleasant, Westmoreland County, Pennsylvania. It encompasses 268 contributing buildings, 1 contributing site, and 1 contributing object in the central business district and surrounding residential areas of Mount Pleasant.  They were built between about 1812 and 1948, and includes a mix of residential, commercial, institutional, and industrial properties. They are in a variety of popular architectural styles including Italianate, Queen Anne, and Colonial Revival. Notable buildings include the Overholt General Store (c. 1860), harness shop (c. 1870), warehouse (c. 1880), East End Hotel (c. 1885), Grand Central Hotel (c. 1895), Gerechter Furniture Building (c. 1905), Citizens Savings and Trust Company and First National Bank (1905), Shupe Steam Grist Mill (1843), City Hall (1910), Penn Theater (1937), Reunion Presbyterian Church (1873), Wesley United Methodist Church (1856), Transfiguration Roman Catholic Church (1889), and three houses built about 1812. The contributing site is Frick Park. The district includes the separately listed Samuel Warden House and demolished Mount Pleasant Armory.

It was added to the National Register of Historic Places in 1998.

References

Historic districts on the National Register of Historic Places in Pennsylvania
Italianate architecture in Pennsylvania
Queen Anne architecture in Pennsylvania
Colonial Revival architecture in Pennsylvania
Historic districts in Westmoreland County, Pennsylvania
National Register of Historic Places in Westmoreland County, Pennsylvania